A Ship Bound for India is a 1947 Swedish film directed by Ingmar Bergman.  It was originally released as A Ship to India in the United Kingdom and Frustration in the United States.  The screenplay was written by Bergman, based on the play by Martin Söderhjelm.

The film is about the relationships within a family, a subject with which Bergman often dealt in later films, and uses other common devices of Bergman such as the hard father figure.

Birger Malmsten, who plays the lead character Johannes, went on to feature in several later Bergman films.

The film was entered into the 1947 Cannes Film Festival.

Plot
Johannes is a sailor who returns home after seven years of travel and finds Sally, the girl he once loved, and many memories resurface in him. Realizing that he still loves her, he declares it to her but Sally rejects him. Johannes walks wandering on the beach and thinks back to the past, to something that happened seven years ago during a marine recovery. Since Captain Blom, his father, is absent, Johannes, in order to keep the sailors under control, takes command of the operation. Meanwhile, Blom goes between one tavern and another and in one of these he starts a fight and, after courting a girl named Sally, he takes her away with him. Blom is later diagnosed with a serious eye disease that will lead to blindness.

Sally goes to live in the Blom family's boat, but furious arguments break out between Johannes and his abusive father. Johannes and Sally fall in love and this causes Blom's anger to become even stronger. While Blom's wife tries to persuade her husband to return to her, Johannes and Sally make love in an old mill and Sally later confesses to the captain her love for Johannes. A heated discussion ensues in which Sally tells Blom that he is a total failure.

During the resumption of the recovery operation, where Johannes works under the keel as a diver while Blom is in charge of the pump, the latter tries to kill his son by interrupting the flow of air that goes to the diving suit. Johannes is saved, but Blom, in a fit of madness, plunges the recovered wreck into the sea and destroys everything. When the police arrive to arrest him, he throws himself out of the window, nearly killing himself.

After this shocking episode, Johannes embarks as a sailor and leaves for India, while Sally returns to sing and dance in the seedy club where she worked before.

Cast

References

External links

1947 films
Films directed by Ingmar Bergman
Films with screenplays by Ingmar Bergman
1940s Swedish-language films
Swedish black-and-white films
1947 drama films
Swedish drama films